George Zhu, or Zhu Zhaojiang, is Chinese businessman and president of Transsion Holdings.

Background 
Zhu was born in Kaiping, China. He founded Tecno Telecommunications Limited, now known as Transsion Holdings based in Hong Kong. The company produces mobile phones and electronic appliances. Zho was also co-founder of Zhima Tech, a wireless company made for collections of data.

He was a former executive for Rockwell International in China before starting his own company. He was also associated with Cisco, Tencent, ZTE, and Google and was listed among China's under-30s businessmen in Forbes.

Notes 

Living people
20th-century Chinese businesspeople
21st-century Chinese businesspeople
1975 births

 infinix is also his sub Sidney.